Edgar A. Geerlings (April 24, 1937?) was a Michigan politician.

Early life
Geerlings was born on April 24, 1937.

Education
Geerlings graduated from Central Michigan University with a Bachelor's degree and a Master's degree. Geerlings did addition graduate work at the University of Michigan, Michigan State University, and Western Michigan University.

Career
Geerlings was a school teacher. In 1964, Geerlings unsuccessfully ran as the Republican candidate for the Michigan House of Representatives seat representing the 97th district. On November 8, 1966, Geerlings was elected to the Michigan House of Representatives where he represented the 97th district from January 11, 1967 to 1986. In 1992, Geerlings unsuccessfully ran as the Republican candidate for the Michigan House of Representatives seat representing the 91st district.

Personal life
Geerlings got married in 1959. Geerlings was part of the National Education Association. Geerlings was a member of the Reformed Church of America.

Death

References

1937 births
Central Michigan University alumni
Reformed Church in America members
Republican Party members of the Michigan House of Representatives
20th-century American politicians
Living people